Giovanna Cesare (born April 3, 2005 in Hershey, Pennsylvania) is a Latina American actress and recording artist. Cesare is best known for co-starring as Jessy in film Street.

Career 
Cesare started her career at the age of six. She is best known for her role as Jessy in Street and lead role as Sarah Lapp in the TV series Amish Haunting filmed at the true Amish farm historical White Chimneys. She is also known for her role as Nina in the film The Kids From 62F.

Filmography 
Television

Films

Awards and nominations

References

External links

Living people
2005 births
American actresses
People from Hershey, Pennsylvania
21st-century American women